Salve (translit. Marham) is a 2011 Iranian drama film directed by Alireza Davood Nejad. Kobra Hassanzadeh Esfahani won the Best Actress award in the Asia Africa section at 7th Dubai International Film Festival.

Cast
 Tannaz Tabatabaei as Maryam
 Ehteram-Sadat Habibian as Ehteram
 Kobra Hassanzadeh Esfahani as Ashraf Sadat
 Alireza Davood Nejad as Reza

Reception
Well-known Iranian directors such as Bahram Beizayi and Asghar Farhadi praised the film.

References

External links
 

2011 films
2011 drama films
2010s Persian-language films
Iranian drama films